Avishai Cohen is a New York City–based jazz musician and composer originally from Tel Aviv, Israel.

Biography 

Cohen was born in Tel Aviv, Israel. He grew up in a musical family with his saxophonist siblings: sister Anat Cohen and brother Yuval Cohen (soprano saxophone). At the age of eight Avishai asked his mother if he could begin taking trumpet lessons. At age ten, Avishai began playing with the Rimon Big Band, He recalls, "I had a box I stood on." As a teenager Avishai toured with the Israeli Philharmonic Orchestra.

Avishai Cohen attended the Berklee College of Music in Boston. 

After graduating from Berklee, Cohen went on to win 3rd place in the Thelonious Monk jazz trumpet competition in 1997. 

Cohen then moved to New York City, where he began developing his music alongside Jason Lindner and bassist Omer Avital at Smalls Jazz Club. 

Because he was frequently confused with bassist Avishai Cohen, he named his debut 2003 album The Trumpet Player. 

He has played with several jazz groups that include musicians from the SFJAZZ Collective. Cohen has stated that he was very heavily influenced by Miles Davis.

Discography

As leader 
 The Trumpet Player (Fresh Sound, 2003) – recorded in 2001
 After the Big Rain (Anzic, 2007) – recorded in 2006
 Flood (Anzic, 2008)
 Seven (Anzic, 2008)
 Introducing Triveni (Anzic, 2010)
 Triveni II (Anzic, 2012) – recorded in 2009
 Avishai Cohen's Triveni, Dark Nights (Anzic, 2014) – recorded in 2013
 Into the Silence (ECM, 2016) – recorded in 2015
 Cross My Palm with Silver (ECM, 2017) – recorded in 2016
 Playing the Room with Yonathan Avishai (ECM, 2019) – recorded in 2018
 Big Vicious (ECM, 2020) – recorded in 2019
 Naked Truth (ECM, 2022) – recorded in 2021

As group 
SFJAZZ Collective
 Live 2010: 7th Annual Concert Tour (SFJAZZ, 2010)[3CD]
 Live in New York 2011 - Season 8 - The Music of Stevie Wonder (SFJAZZ, 2011)[3CD]
 Live: SFJAZZ Center 2013 - The Music of Chick Corea (SFJAZZ, 2013)[2CD]
 Live: SFJAZZ Center 2014 - The Music of Joe Henderson (SFJAZZ, 2014)[2CD]
 10th Anniversary: Best of - Live at the SFJAZZ Center 2013 (SFJAZZ, 2014)

Third World Love
 Third World Love Songs (Fresh Sound, 2002)
 Avanim (self-released, 2004) – also released from NMC Music
 Sketch of Tel Aviv (self-released, 2006) – also released from Smalls
 New Blues (Anzic, 2008)
 Songs and Portraits (Anzic, 2012)

3 CohensWith Anat Cohen and Yuval Cohen
 One (Self, 2003)
 Braid (Anzic, 2007)
 Family (Anzic, 2011)
 Tightrope (Anzic, 2013)

Omer Avital
 Marlon Browden Project (Fresh Sound, 2003)
 The Ancient Art of Giving (Smalls, 2006)
 Arrival (Fresh Sound, 2007)
 Free Forever (Smalls, 2011)
 Live at Smalls (SmallsLIVE, 2011)
 Suite of the East (Anzic, 2012)
 New Song (Motéma, 2014)

As sideman 
With Keren Ann
 Nolita (Metro Blue/Blue Note, 2005)
 Keren Ann (EMI, 2007)

With Anat Cohen
 Place & Time (Anzic, 2005)
 Noir (Anzic, 2006)

With others
 Jason Lindner Big Band, Live at the Jazz Gallery (Anzic, 2007) – live
 Gregory Tardy, Monuments (SteepleChase, 2011)
 Mark Turner, Lathe of Heaven (ECM, 2014) – recorded in 2013

References

External links

Israeli jazz musicians
Living people
1978 births
Israeli trumpeters
Jazz trumpeters
People from Tel Aviv
21st-century trumpeters
SFJAZZ Collective members